Vycpálek is a Czech surname. Notable people with the surname include:

Čestmír Vycpálek (1921–2002), Czech football player and manager
Ladislav Vycpálek (1882–1969), Czech composer and violist

Czech-language surnames